The 2017 Memorial Cup (branded as the 2017 Mastercard Memorial Cup for sponsorship reasons) was a four-team, round-robin format tournament held at the WFCU Centre in Windsor, Ontario from May 19–28, 2017. It was the 99th Memorial Cup championship, which determined the champion of the Canadian Hockey League (CHL). The tournament was hosted by the Windsor Spitfires, who won the right to host the tournament over undisclosed competition. Other participating teams were the OHL champion Erie Otters, the QMJHL champion Saint John Sea Dogs, and the WHL champion Seattle Thunderbirds. The tournament ended with the Windsor Spitfires winning their third Memorial Cup, defeating the Erie Otters 4–3 in the championship final.

The 99th Memorial Cup was dominated by the performances of the two OHL teams. In defeating the Seattle Thunderbirds by 7–1 in a round-robin game on May 21, 2017, the Windsor Spitfires tied a Memorial Cup record for the fastest 3 goals scored by a team in a single period (38 game seconds), matching the record set by the WHL's New Westminster Bruins in the 1978 tournament. In a round-robin game on May 22, 2017, Dylan Strome scored a Memorial Cup single-game record seven points (four goals and three assists), leading the Erie Otters to a 12–5 win over the Saint John Sea Dogs. The Otters' 12 goals for a team in a single game was also a Memorial Cup record.

All games were televised nationally in Canada on Sportsnet and TVA Sports. The NHL Network televised the games in the United States.

Round-robin standings

Schedule
All times local (UTC −4)

Round robin

Playoff round

Semi-final

Final

Statistical leaders

Skaters

GP = Games played; G = Goals; A = Assists; Pts = Points; PIM = Penalty minutes

Goaltending

This is a combined table of the top goaltenders based on goals against average and save percentage with at least 120 minutes played. The table is sorted by GAA.

GP = Games played; W = Wins; L = Losses; SA = Shots against; GA = Goals against; GAA = Goals against average; SV% = Save percentage; SO = Shutouts; TOI = Time on ice (minutes:seconds)

Awards
 Stafford Smythe Memorial Trophy (MVP): Dylan Strome, Erie Otters
 Ed Chynoweth Trophy (Leading Scorer): Dylan Strome, Erie Otters
 George Parsons Trophy (Sportsmanlike): Anthony Cirelli, Erie Otters
 Hap Emms Memorial Trophy (Top Goalie): Michael DiPietro, Windsor Spitfires
 All-Star Team:
Goaltender: Michael DiPietro, Windsor Spitfires
Defence: Darren Raddysh, Erie Otters; Mikhail Sergachev, Windsor Spitfires
Forwards: Gabriel Vilardi, Windsor Spitfires; Alex DeBrincat, Erie Otters; Taylor Raddysh, Erie Otters

Rosters

Windsor Spitfires (Host)
Head coach: Rocky Thompson

Saint John Sea Dogs (QMJHL)
Head coach: Danny Flynn

Erie Otters (OHL)
Head coach: Kris Knoblauch

Seattle Thunderbirds (WHL)
Head coach: Steve Konowalchuk

Road to the Cup

OHL Playoffs

QMJHL Playoffs

WHL Playoffs

References

External links
 Memorial Cup
 Canadian Hockey League

Memorial Cup tournaments
Memorial Cup
Memorial Cup
Memorial Cup